Pyatino is a rural locality (a village) in Borovetskoye Rural Settlement, Sokolsky District, Vologda Oblast, Russia. The population was 42 as of 2002.

Geography 
Pyatino is located 5 km west of Sokol (the district's administrative centre) by road. Rostovka is the nearest rural locality.

References 

Rural localities in Sokolsky District, Vologda Oblast